ESX may refer to:

 VMware ESX, a computer virtualization product
 Dodge Intrepid ESX, a hybrid electric automobile
 Essex Junction station (station code ESX), Vermont, United States
 ESX-1, an Electribe electronic musical instrument
 Ethosuximide, an anti epileptic drugs paper
 ESX-1, a pore-forming protein system of M.tuberculosis